People's News can refer to:

 Lidové noviny, a Czech newspaper
 Jimmin Shimbun, a Japanese newspaper

See also:
 People's Daily, a Chinese newspaper